Idrissa Kabore (born 9 August 1977) is a Burkinabé boxer who competed at the 1996 Summer Olympics.

Kabore was the youngest competitor to represent Burkina Faso at the 1996 Summer Olympics, he entered the lightweight division in the boxing events but lost his first round fight on points against Jaroslav Konečný from the Czech Republic.

References

1977 births
Living people
Olympic boxers of Burkina Faso
Boxers at the 1996 Summer Olympics
Burkinabé male boxers
Lightweight boxers
21st-century Burkinabé people